The common krait (Bungarus caeruleus), also known as Bengal krait, is a species of highly venomous elapid snake of the genus Bungarus native to the Indian subcontinent. It is a member of the "Big Four" species that inflict the most snakebites on humans in Pakistan, India and Bangladesh.

Description

Males are longer than females, with proportionately longer tails. The head is flat and the neck hardly evident. The body is cylindrical, tapering towards the tail. The tail is short and rounded. The eyes are rather small, with rounded pupils, indistinguishable in life. The head shields are normal, with no loreals; four shields occur along the margin of the lower lip; the third and fourth supraoculars touch the eye. The scales are highly polished, in 15-17 rows; the vertebral row is distinctly enlarged and hexagonal. Ventrals number 185-225 and caudals 37-50, and are entire (intact).

Their colouration is generally black or bluish black, with about 40 thin, white crossbars, which may be indistinct or absent anteriorly. Albino specimens can be found, although such cases are extremely rare. The pattern, however, is complete and well defined in the young, which are marked with conspicuous crossbars even anteriorly; in old individuals, the narrow white lines may be found as a series of connected spots, with a prominent spot on the vertebral region. A white preocular spot may be present; the upper lips and belly are white.

Distribution and habitat
It has also been recorded in Afghanistan, Bangladesh, and Nepal.

It lives in a wide variety of habitats, from fields and low scrub jungle to settled areas. It rests in termite mounds, brick piles, rat holes, and even inside houses. It is frequently encountered in water or in proximity to a water source.

Behaviour and ecology

Behavioral differences during day and night have been reported in B. caeruleus. During the day, it is sluggish and generally docile. It often hides in rodent holes, loose soil, or beneath debris, so is rarely seen. It often rolls its body into a loose, coiled ball, keeping its head well concealed. When in this "balled" condition, the snake allows considerable handling, but overhandling often instigates bites. At night, though, the snake is very active and escapes by hissing loudly, or keeping still, occasionally biting the source of the annoyance.

When agitated, it coils up with its head concealed and body flattened, and makes jerky movements. It may also lift its tail. It is reluctant to bite, but when it does, it typically holds on for a while, which enables it to inject considerable amounts of venom. It may become aggressive at night if threatened, since this is its active time. It is responsible for the second-highest number of snake bites in India for a single species. In Bangladesh, it is responsible for 28% of total krait bites.

Diet
The common krait feeds primarily on other snakes, and cannibalizes on other kraits, including the young. It also feeds on small mammals (such as rats, and mice), lizards, and frogs. The young are known to eat arthropods and the blind snakes (snakes of the family typhlopidae).

Venom
The common krait's venom consists mostly of powerful neurotoxins, which induce muscle paralysis. Clinically, its venom contains presynaptic and postsynaptic neurotoxins, which generally affect the synaptic cleft (the points of information transfer between neurons).

In mice, the  values of its venom are 0.325 mg/kg subcutaneously, 0.169 mg/kg intravenously, and 0.089 mg/kg intraperitoneally. and the average venom yield is 10 mg (dry weight). The estimated lethal dose for humans is 2-3 mg.

Kraits are nocturnal, so seldom encounter humans during daylight; incidents occur mainly at night. Frequently, little or no pain occurs from its bite, which can provide false reassurance to the victim. Typically, victims complain of severe abdominal cramps, accompanied by progressive paralysis. If death occurs, it takes place about 4-8 hours after the krait bite. Cause of death is general respiratory failure, i.e. suffocation.

Often during the rainy season, the snakes come out of their hiding places and find refuge inside dry houses. If bitten by a krait while sleeping, a victim may not realize as having been bitten, as the bite feels like that of an ant or mosquito. The victim may die without waking up. Krait bites are significant for eliciting minimal amounts of local inflammation/swelling. This may help in species identification if the snake has not been seen.

The few symptoms of the bite include tightening of the facial muscles in 1-2 hours of the bite and inability of the bite victim to see or talk, and if left untreated, the patient may die from respiratory paralysis within 4-5 hours. A clinical toxicology study reports an untreated mortality rate of 70-80%. In Bangladesh, more than 50% of total snake bite deaths are caused by the common krait.

References

Further reading

Bungarus
Reptiles of Afghanistan
Reptiles of Bangladesh
Reptiles of India
Reptiles of Nepal
Reptiles of Pakistan
Reptiles of Sri Lanka
Reptiles described in 1801
Taxa named by Johann Gottlob Theaenus Schneider